M. oregonensis may refer to:
 Marmara oregonensis, a moth species
 Metagonimoides oregonensis, a trematode species found in North America
 Methanolobus oregonensis, an Archaea species in the genus Methanolobus
 Moropus oregonensis, an extinct mammal species in the genus Moropus